The mixed 4 × 100 metre freestyle relay event at the 2018 Summer Youth Olympics took place on 7 October at the Natatorium in Buenos Aires, Argentina.

Results

Heats
The heats were started at 11:27.

Final
The final was held at 18:51.

References

Swimming at the 2018 Summer Youth Olympics
Youth Olympics